Ectenessidia is a genus of beetles in the family Cerambycidae, containing the following species:

 Ectenessidia metallica Napp & Martins, 2006
 Ectenessidia nigriventris (Belon, 1902)
 Ectenessidia varians (Gounelle, 1909)

References

Ectenessini